Annual Review of Fluid Mechanics is a peer-reviewed scientific journal covering research on fluid mechanics. It is published once a year by Annual Reviews and the editors are Parviz Moin and Howard Stone.
As of 2022,  Journal Citation Reports gives the journal a 2021 impact factor of 25.293, ranking it first out of 34 journals in "Physics, Fluids and Plasmas" and first out of 138 journals in the category "Mechanics".

History
The Annual Review of Fluid Mechanics was first published in 1969 by the nonprofit publisher Annual Reviews. Its inaugural editor was William R. Sears. Taking after the Annual Review of Biochemistry, each volume typically begins with a prefatory chapter in which a notable scientist in the field reflects on their career and accomplishments. As of 2020, it was published both in print and electronically. Some of its articles are available online in advance of the volume's publication date.

It defines its scope as covering significant developments in the field of fluid mechanics, including its history and foundations, non-newtonian fluids, rheology, incompressible and compressible flow, plasma flow, flow stability, multiphase flow, heat mixture and transport, control of fluid flow, combustion, turbulence, shock waves, and explosions. As of 2022,  Journal Citation Reports gives the journal a 2021 impact factor of 25.293, ranking it first out of 34 journals in "Physics, Fluids and Plasmas" and first out of 138 journals in the category "Mechanics". It is abstracted and indexed in Scopus, Science Citation Index Expanded, PASCAL, Inspec, GEOBASE, and Academic Search, among others.

Editorial processes
The Annual Review of Fluid Mechanics is helmed by the editor or the co-editors. The editor is assisted by the editorial committee, which includes associate editors, regular members, and occasionally guest editors. Guest members participate at the invitation of the editor, and serve terms of one year. All other members of the editorial committee are appointed by the Annual Reviews board of directors and serve five-year terms. The editorial committee determines which topics should be included in each volume and solicits reviews from qualified authors. Unsolicited manuscripts are not accepted. Peer review of accepted manuscripts is undertaken by the editorial committee.

Editors of volumes
Dates indicate publication years in which someone was credited as a lead editor or co-editor of a journal volume. The planning process for a volume begins well before the volume appears, so appointment to the position of lead editor generally occurred prior to the first year shown here. An editor who has retired or died may be credited as a lead editor of a volume that they helped to plan, even if it is published after their retirement or death. 

 William R. Sears (1969)
 Milton Van Dyke, Walter G. Vincenti, and John V. Wehausen (1970–1976)
 Van Dyke, Wehausen, and John L. Lumley (1977–1986)
 Van Dyke, Lumley, and Helen L. Reed (1987–2000)
 Lumley, Reed, and Stephen H. Davis (2001)
 Lumley, Davis, and Parviz Moin (2002)
 Davis and Moin (2003–2021)
 Moin and Howard A. Stone (present)

Current editorial committee
As of 2022, the editorial committee consists of the co-editors and the following members:

 Jonathan B. Freund
 Dennice F. Gayme
 Anne Juel
 Daniel Livescu
 Beverley J. McKeon
 Geoff Vallis
 Roberto Zenit

See also
List of fluid mechanics journals

References 

 

Publications established in 1969
English-language journals
Fluid dynamics journals
Annual journals
Fluid Mechanics